Lantau Link Visitors Centre is located on the Tsing Yi Island of Hong Kong.

It displays the information of the Lantau Link. The Centre contains models, photographs and panel texts about the Link.

There is a video on building of the Tsing Ma Bridge as well as one on the Airport Core Programme. A cross-section of the Tsing Ma Bridge's main suspension cable is on display outside the centre.

There are two computer quizzes provided for the visitors testing their knowledge of the Lantau Link.

There is a viewing platform outside the centre; the Tsing Ma Bridge can be viewed on the platform.

Transportation
The centre is accessible West from Tsing Yi station of MTR.

Exhibition link

Lantau Link Visitor Centre and Viewing Platform

Museums in Hong Kong
Tsing Yi